Fargoa bushiana is a species of sea snail, a marine gastropod mollusk in the family Pyramidellidae, the pyrams and their allies.

Description
The shell grows to a length of 3.7 mm.

Distribution
This species occurs in the following locations:
 Caribbean Sea
 Colombia
 Gulf of Mexico
 Lesser Antilles
 Atlantic Ocean (Massachusetts to Central Brazil)

Notes
Additional information regarding this species:
 Distribution: Cape Cod to Rhode Island; Texas

References

External links
 To Biodiversity Heritage Library (1 publication)
 To Encyclopedia of Life
 To GenBank
 To USNM Invertebrate Zoology Mollusca Collection
 To ITIS
 To World Register of Marine Species

Pyramidellidae
Gastropods described in 1909